William Herndon may refer to:
William Lewis Herndon (1813–1857), officer and explorer in the United States Navy
William Herndon (lawyer) (1818–1891), law partner and biographer of Abraham Lincoln
William S. Herndon (1835–1903), U.S. Representative from Texas